Sakurai (written: 桜井 or  literally "well of the cherry blossom") is a Japanese surname. Notable people with the surname include:

Atsushi Sakurai (born 1966), vocalist for the band Buck-Tick
Hayato Sakurai (born 1975), mixed martial arts fighter
, Japanese ice hockey player
Jun John Sakurai (1933–1982), physicist
, Japanese swimmer
Kazutoshi Sakurai (born 1970), musician
, Japanese baseball player
, Japanese triple jumper
, Japanese ice hockey player
Masahiro Sakurai (桜井 政博, born 1970), game designer
Masaru Sakurai (born 1955), singer for The Alfee
Makoto Sakurai (born 1972), right-wing activist
, Japanese idol, singer and actress
, singer, songwriter and actor, member of Arashi
, football player
, general of the Imperial Japanese Army
Takahiro Sakurai (born 1974), voice actor
Takao Sakurai (born 1941), Japanese boxer
Tokutaro Sakurai, (1897–1980), general of the Imperial Japanese Army
Toshiharu Sakurai (born 1964), Japanese voice actor
Yoshiko Sakurai (born 1945), journalist
Tetsuo Sakurai (born 1957), bassist of Casiopea

Fictional characters
Kanade Sakurai, one of the main characters in the anime/manga Candy Boy
Shizuku Sakurai, one of the supporting characters in the anime/manga Candy Boy
Yukino Sakurai, another one of the main characters in the anime/manga Candy Boy
Yuuto Sakurai, one of the supporting characters in the television series Kamen Rider Den-O
Rihoko Sakurai, one of the 6 lead females of the anime and manga Amagami SS
Tomoki Sakurai, main character of Heaven's Lost Property
Kouichi Sakurai, one of the main 'prince' of otome game Tokimeki Memorial Girl's Side: 3rd Story
Goro Sakurai, one of the main characters in the J.A.K.Q. Dengekitai
Ryō Sakurai, a character from the anime/manga Kuroko no Basket
Izumi Sakurai, a character from the anime/manga Nichijou
Makoto Sakurai, a character from the anime/manga Nichijou
Shinichi Sakurai, one of the main characters in the anime and manga Uzaki-chan Wants to Hang Out!
Ryoko Sakurai, a character in the manga and anime series Great Teacher Onizuka

See also
Sakurai's Object, a star named after Japanese amateur astronomer Yukio Sakurai

Japanese-language surnames